Olivier Soutet (born 1 November 1951 in Paris) is a French linguist. A specialist of historical grammar of the French language, he was a professor at the université Paris-Sorbonne and dean of the Faculty of Letters of the Institut catholique de Paris.

Publications 
1977: 
1980:  (reprinted in 1987 and 1994)
1989:  (reprinted in 1993, 1998, 2005 and 2009)
1990: 
1992: 
1992: 
1995:  (reprinted in 1997, 2001 and 2005)
1998:  
2000: 
2004:

External links 
 Notice on the site of the Académie des Inscriptions et Belles-Lettres
 Resume on the site of Paris-Sorbonne
 Olivier Soutet, Linguistique review by Éric Bordas on Persée 

Linguists from France
École Normale Supérieure alumni
Corresponding members of the Académie des Inscriptions et Belles-Lettres
Scientists from Paris
1951 births
Living people